Washington Township is a township in Carroll County, in the U.S. state of Missouri.

Washington Township has the name of President George Washington.

References

Townships in Missouri
Townships in Carroll County, Missouri